Apollo is a Greek and Roman god of music, healing, light, prophecy and enlightenment.

Apollo may also refer to:

Animals
Apollo (dog) (1992–2006), a German Shepherd search and rescue dog
Apollo (horse) (1879–1887), an American Thoroughbred racehorse
Parnassius, a genus of swallowtail butterflies commonly known as the Apollos; in particular
Parnassius apollo, a Parnassius butterfly found in Europe commonly known as the Apollo
Parnassius autocrator, a Parnassius butterfly found in Afghanistan and Taj

Arts, entertainment and media

Fictional entities
Apollo (Battlestar Galactica), the name of several characters in the Battlestar Galactica universe
Lee Adama, a character in the 2004 re-imagining of Battlestar Galactica
Captain Apollo, a character in the original Battlestar Galactica television series
Apollo (comics), a member of in Wildstorm Comics' The Authority
Apollo (Marvel Comics), a comic book character
Apollo (Saint Seiya), a character in the fictional universe of Masami Kurumada's manga Saint Seiya
Apollo (Star Trek), an alien in the Star Trek episode "Who Mourns for Adonais?"
Apollo, a character in the musical TV series Pajanimals
Apollo, a character in The Amory Wars comic book series
Apollo, a character in the Zatch Bell! anime/manga series
Apollo Candy, a fictional candy bar in the Lost television series
Apollo Creed, a boxer played by Carl Weathers in the Rocky film series
 Apollo Justice, character in Capcom's Ace Attorney video-game series
 USS Apollo,  a BC-304 class deep space carrier in Stargate: Atlantis, see List of Earth starships in Stargate
 USS Apollo (NCC-1725), a starship in the video game  Starfleet Academy
 USS Apollo (NCC-17706), a starship in Star Trek: Legacy and Star Trek: The Next Generation Role-playing Game

Music

Groups and labels
 Apollo (band), an American R&B/disco group that recorded for Motown Records in the late 1970s
 Apollo Records (1921), US label
 Apollo Records (1928), US label
 Apollo Records (1944), US label
 Apollo Records (Belgium), Belgian label

Albums
Apollo (Nebula album), an album by the group Nebula
Apollo (Stockholm Syndrome album), an album by the group Stockholm Syndrome
Apollo: Atmospheres and Soundtracks, 1983 album by Brian Eno

Songs
"Apollo" (Porno Graffitti song), 1999
"Apollo" (Timebelle song), the Swiss entrant in the Switzerland in the Eurovision Song Contest 2017
 "Apollo" (Hardwell song), 2012
"Apollo", a 1984 song by Orchestral Manoeuvres in the Dark from the album Junk Culture

Literature
Apollo (journal), journal, magazine
 Apollo (magazine), British arts magazine

Other uses in arts, entertainment and media
 Apollo (ballet), 1928 George Balanchine choreography for Stravinsky's Apollon musagète
Showtime at the Apollo, an American music television series
 Apollo (Michelangelo), marble sculpture
Apollo Gauntlet, an American animated television series on Adult Swim
 Prix Apollo Award (late 20th century), for French for science-fiction literature
 Apollo (System Copernicus), a stained glass window

Businesses and organisations

Brands and enterprises
Apollo, a deodorant product by Axe/Lynx
Apollo oil refinery, a Nazi Germany facility in the Oil campaign of World War II
 Apollo Cinemas, chain 
Apollo Computer Inc., a workstation manufacturer, founded in 1980, and acquired in 1989 by Hewlett-Packard Company
Apollo Diamond, an American diamond-manufacturing company
Apollo Global Management, private equity investment firm
Apollo Education Group, a company specializing in adult education
Apollo Hospitals, a healthcare group in India
Apollo Theatre (disambiguation), several uses, including "Apollo Theater"
Apollo Tyres, an Indian tyre manufacturer
Apollo Ultralight Aircraft, a Hungarian microlight aircraft manufacturer
Apollo-Optik, an optics company
Games by Apollo, a third-party video game developer for the Atari 2600
Hammersmith Apollo, entertainment venue in London

Education
Apollo Junior High School of Richardson, Texas
Carrington College (US), a privately held higher education organization, known before June 2010 as Apollo College

Organizations
Apollo University Lodge, the principal Masonic Lodge of the University of Oxford

Military
Apollo-class cruiser of the Royal Navy
Apollo-class frigate, Royal Navy sailing frigates
HMS Apollo, various Royal Navy ships
USS Apollo (AS-25), a 1943 United States Navy submarine tender

People
 Apollos (1st-century A.D.), Alexandrian Jewish-Christian
 Apollo (4th century A.D.), Coptic ascetic and martyr associated with Abib
 Apollo (monk), Egyptian Christian monk
 Steve Apollo (born 1949), pseudonym of illustrator Jim Starlin 
 Dale Cook (born 1958), known as Apollo, American kickboxer
 Apollo Crews (born 1987), American professional wrestler
 Apollo Kironde (1915–2007), Ugandan ambassador
 Apollo Korzeniowski (1820–1869), Polish writer, and father of Joseph Conrad
 Apolo Ohno (born 1982), American skating medalist
 Apollo Papathanasio (born 1969), vocalist of Greek power metal band Firewind
 Apollo Perelini (born 1969), New Zealand rugby player
 Apollo Quiboloy (born 1950), Filipino televangelist 
 Apollo Robbins (born 1974), American sleight-of-hand artist and deception specialist
 Apollo M. O. Smith (1911–1997), American rocket scientist
 Apollo Soucek (1897–1955), American test pilot and vice admiral

Places

Extraterrestrial
Apollo (crater), a basin on the far side of the Moon
1862 Apollo, a near-Earth asteroid discovered in 1932
Apollo asteroids, a group of near-Earth asteroids

Terrestrial
 Apollo, a town near Johannesburg, South Africa, location of static inverter plant of Cahora Bassa
Apollo, Georgia, United States
Apollo, Pennsylvania, United States
Apollo Bay, Victoria, Australia
Apollo Bay, Tasmania, Australia
Apollo Beach, Florida
Apollo Bridge, a road bridge over the Danube in Bratislava
Apollo Temple, a summit in the Grand Canyon, U.S.

Science and technology
Apache Point Observatory Lunar Laser-ranging Operation (APOLLO), an observatory in New Mexico
Apollo program, a series of American space missions that ultimately landed men on the Moon
Acute hemorrhagic conjunctivitis, referred to colloquially in Ghana as "Apollo"
 Apollo (cable system), a cable crossing the Atlantic Ocean
 Apollo, the code name of Apple's Macintosh Classic II
 Apollo, the code name of Windows Phone 8, Microsoft's smartphone operating system
 Adobe Integrated Runtime, a cross-OS runtime system originally codenamed "Apollo"
 Apollo/Domain, a series of workstations made by Apollo Computer
 Apollo Reservation System, the computerized central reservation system developed by United Airlines

Sports
 Apollo 55, professional wrestling tag team
 Apollo of Temple, now Philadelphia sports venue Liacouras Center
 Orlando Apollos, an American football team in the Alliance of American Football

Transportation

Automobiles
Apollo (1906 automobile), an American car made from 1906 to 1907
Apollo (1910 automobile), a German car built from 1910 to 1927
Apollo (1962 automobile), an American sports car built from 1962 to 1964
Apollo Automobil, a German sports car manufacturing company
Gumpert Apollo, a racing and high-performance sports car produced by Apollo Automobil
Holden Apollo, an automobile manufactured by Toyota and sold by Holden in Australia from 1989 to 1997
Volkswagen Apollo, a rebadged version of the Ford Verona automobile sold in Brazil between 1990 and 1992
Buick Apollo, an American compact car built from 1973 to 1975

Ships
 Apollo (1812 EIC ship)
Apollo (storeship), an historic storeship
ST Apollo, a tugboat
HMS Royal Scotsman, later renamed Apollo, a passenger ferry repurposed in the 1960s as founding flagship of the Sea Org of the Church of Scientology
MV Apollo, a vehicle and passenger ferry in Canada

Other
 Apollo, a steam locomotive of the West Cornwall Railway
Ducati Apollo, a prototype motorcycle of 1964
Armstrong Whitworth Apollo, a prototype airliner

See also

 Apollon (disambiguation)
 Apollos, a 1st-century Alexandrian Jewish Christian
 Apolo (disambiguation)
 Appollo (disambiguation)
 Appolo (disambiguation)
 Apollo Sea